Kasidit Samrej (born 26 January 2001) is a Thai tennis player.

Samrej has a career high ATP singles ranking of 622 achieved on 13 January 2020. He also has a career high ATP doubles ranking of 1494 achieved on 2 December 2019.

Samrej represents Thailand at the Davis Cup, where he has a W/L record of 0–1.

References

External links

2001 births
Living people
Kasidit Samrej
Competitors at the 2021 Southeast Asian Games
Kasidit Samrej
Kasidit Samrej
Southeast Asian Games medalists in tennis
Kasidit Samrej